Ministry of Economic Affairs (MOEA) is ministry of Bhutan responsible for proper management of economy in the country.

Departments 
The Ministry of Economic Affairs is responsible for:
Department of Trade
Department of Industry
Department of Intellectual Property
Department of Geology and Mines
Department of Hydro-Met Services
Department of Renewable Energy
Department of Hydropower & Power Systems
Department of Cottage & Small Industry 
Office of Consumer Protection

Minister 
 Norbu Wangchuk (2013-2016)
 Khandu Wangchuk (11 April 2008 - ...)
 Loknath Sharma (7 November 2018 - ...)

References

Economic Affairs
Bhutan
Economy of Bhutan